The men's pole vault event at the 2003 IAAF World Indoor Championships was held on March 14–15, 2003.

Medalists

Results

Qualification
To qualify for the final, vaulters had to clear at least 5.65 m or be among the eight best performers.

Final

References
Results

Pole
Pole vault at the World Athletics Indoor Championships